San Donato is the Spanish and Italian form of Saint Donatus.  It can refer to:

People
Saint Donatus of Arezzo (died 362)
Saint Donatus of Fiesole (9th century)
Dukedom of San Donato, noble title

Places
San Donato di Lecce 
San Donato di Ninea 
San Donato Milanese
San Donato Val di Comino
San Donato, Orbetello
San Donato, San Gimignano
San Donato, San Miniato
San Donato, Santa Maria a Monte

Churches
Church of Santa Maria e San Donato
San Donato (Genoa)
San Donato, Siena

Other
San Donato (Milan Metro)
Villa San Donato
Bologna San Donato railway test circuit